97.7 Snow FM (call sign: 2SKI) is a commercial radio station in New South Wales, covering the areas of Cooma, Jindabyne, Thredbo, Perisher and Charlotte Pass. The station broadcasts on multiple frequencies to reach the townships within the Snowy Mountains region. Snow FM is a part of the Capital Radio Network.

Snow FM services roughly 25,000 permanent residents, but also services the large number of tourists who visit the nearby ski resorts of Thredbo, Perisher, Charlotte Pass and Selwyn Snowfields.

Snow FM shares much of its branding, format and music with their Capital Radio Network sister station, 93.5 Eagle FM, based in Goulburn.

In July 2019, Snow FM begun broadcasting into Canberra on DAB+ Digital Radio. The transmission is made through Capital Radio Network sister stations 2CC and 2CA, based in Canberra.

Notable former announcers 
 Ellie Mobbs (2Day FM)
 Andrew Dunkerley (Triple M, Mix 101.1, Mix 106.3, Mix 106.5)
 Jack Tree (Nova 106.9)
 Cei Saunders (2Day FM)

See also 
List of radio stations in Australia

References

External links 
 Snow FM Snowy Mountains

Radio stations in New South Wales
Contemporary hit radio stations in Australia
Capital Radio Network
Cooma